Cheongoksan is a mountain in the province of Gangwon-do, South Korea. Its area extends across the cities of Donghae and  Samcheok.

See also
List of mountains in Korea

Notes

References
  

Mountains of South Korea
Mountains of Gangwon Province, South Korea
Donghae City
Samcheok
One-thousanders of South Korea